Fred Rüssli was born on 3 June 1942 and is a Swiss rower. He competed in the men's coxless pair event at the 1968 Summer Olympics.

References

1942 births
Living people
Swiss male rowers
Olympic rowers of Switzerland
Rowers at the 1968 Summer Olympics
Rowers from Zürich
20th-century Swiss people